Jocara hispida is a species of snout moth in the genus Jocara. It was described by Paul Dognin in 1906. It is found in South America.

References

Moths described in 1906
Jocara